High Roads is a six-issue limited series created by writer Scott Lobdell and artist Leinil Francis Yu. It was published in April 2002 by Cliffhanger, an imprint of DC Comics' Wildstorm Productions.

It tells about the story of a U.S. Army Captain Nick Highroad, as he tries to survive the final days of World War II. Along the way, he meets up with a British actor, an ex-kamikaze pilot and one of Hitler's mistresses. The foursome come up with a plan to steal one of Hitler's most prized possessions, but instead inadvertently find themselves involved in a plot to thwart the mono-testicled dictator's Final Solution.

See also
Cliffhanger
List of Wildstorm titles

2002 comics debuts
WildStorm limited series